Maradi is the second largest city in Niger and the administrative centre of Maradi Region. It is also the seat of the Maradi Department and an Urban Commune.

History
Originally part of Katsina, a Hausa state, it became independent in the 19th century. From the early 19th century, Maradi was home to one of several Hausa traditional rump states, formed by rulers and nobility who fled the rise of the Sokoto Caliphate. Elements of the Katsina ruling class continued to claim the area as the seat of a Katsina state in exile ruled by the Sarkin Katsina Maradi. Maradi was constrained by the more powerful Gobir exilic state to the west, the Sultanate of Damagaram based at Zinder to the east, and Sokoto to the south. The arrival of the French in 1899 saw the bloody destruction of the town by the Voulet-Chanoine Mission, but later the town recovered to become an important regional centre of commerce by the 1950s.

The expansion of the city in the first half of the 20th century was dynamic, albeit modest, with the population nearly doubling between 1911 and 1950. Up until 1945, the ancient city of Maradi was located in the valley bordering the Goulbi N'Maradi, a seasonal waterway with its source in Nigeria. The urban area, roughly circular in shape, was protected by a mud wall with four doors; the ancient city was flooded by this river at the end of the rainy season of 1945. To avoid future inundation, the French colonial administration decided then to adjust the urban layout. In the process, the city lost its traditional, irregular layout in favour of a grid system. The French sought to create cash-crop agriculture, mostly groundnuts, which increasingly made the city an important regional commercial centre. Aided by economic growth after the 1950s, Maradi experienced a demographic boom, with the population increasing from 8,661 in 1950 to 80,000 by 1983. By the time of Niger's independence in 1960, Maradi was a centre of Hausa culture, vying with the larger traditional Hausa centre of Zinder to the east.

In 2000 a riot broke out in the town by Muslim groups opposed to the staging of the Festival International de la Mode en Afrique (FIMA) in Niamey, resulting in the destruction of various buildings deemed un-Islamic, such as brothels and bars.

Geography
The city is divided into three urban municipalities: Maradi I, Maradi II and Maradi III. Maradi is centred on the Grand-marché, a large daily market of wholesale, retail, and agricultural goods from across south central Niger and also the cross-border trade with Nigeria. Some of the districts in the town include Zaria and Sabon Gari in the north, and to the west Mokoya, Dan Gouleye, Bagalam, Yandaka, Maradawa, Hassao and Limantchi.

Demographics

At the 2012 census, the official population of Maradi was 267,249, making it the second largest city in the country. The predominant ethnic group in the city is Hausa, with a few urbanised Fulani and Tuaregs living there as well. Various ethnic groups from Nigeria, particularly Ibo and Yoruba, can also be found in skilled trades or in small shops.

Places of worship  

There are several large mosques in the town. There are also some Christian churches and temples, with the Roman Catholic Diocese of Maradi, Our Lady of Lourdes Cathedral, various Protestant churches and the Assemblies of God having a presence.

Economy
Maradi is the major transport trade and agricultural hub of Niger's south central Hausa region. It lies on the major east–west paved highway which crosses from Niamey in the west to Diffa in the far east. It also has an airport. Maradi has long been a merchant city, on the route north from Kano, Nigeria. This explains why one can use either the West African CFA franc (Niger's official currency) or the Nigerian Naira for currency in Maradi. The city lies in a region known for groundnut cultivation.

Education 
Université Dan Dicko Dankoulodo UDDM 
Institut Universitaire de Technologie IUT

The Free University of Maradi was founded in 2004.
There is a Maryam Abacha American University Niger located in the city of Maradi.

Culture

Notable people
Siradji Sani, Nigerien footballer
 Mariama Gamatié Bayard, 2011 presidential candidate

Gallery

References

 Finn Fuglestad. A History of Niger: 1850–1960. Cambridge University Press (1983) 
 Jolijn Geels. Niger. Bradt UK/ Globe Pequot Press USA (2006) 
 Samuel Decalo. Historical Dictionary of Niger (3rd ed.). Scarecrow Press, Boston & Folkestone, (1997) 
 Derrick J. Thorn. "The City of Maradi: French Influence Upon a Hausa Urban Center". Journal of Geography, Volume 70, Issue 8 November 1971, pages 472 – 482

External links

 
Populated places in Niger
Tuareg